Eupithecia schuetzeata is a moth in the family Geometridae. It is found on the Canary Islands.

The wingspan is 15–19 mm. Adults are on wing in winter, including December.

The larvae feed on Sonchus species.

References

Moths described in 1961
schuetzeata
Moths of Africa